Pauline O'Reilly is an Irish Green Party politician who has served as a Senator for the Labour Panel since April 2020 and Cathaoirleach of the Green Party since December 2021.

Early life and education
O'Reilly is a qualified solicitor. She is chairwoman of the Galway Steiner National School.

Political career
O'Reilly was elected to Galway City Council at the 2019 local elections.

O'Reilly stood unsuccessfully in Galway West in the 2020 general election. She won 6% of first preference votes and finished ninth in the 5 seater constituency.

She was elected to Seanad Éireann in 2020 as a Senator for the Labour Panel. Niall Murphy was co-opted to O'Reilly's seat on Galway City Council following her election to the Seanad. She is the Green Party Spokesperson for Education and Higher Education. She is the Leader of the Green Party in the Seanad. 

On 24 March 2021, O'Reilly was one of three Green Party senators to table a motion of no confidence against party Cathaoirleach Hazel Chu, after Chu announced her candidacy in a Seanad bye-election as an independent, with O'Reilly stating she does not believe it's appropriate "to run as an Independent candidate and also to be a chair of a party that’s in government and is supporting Government candidates".

In December 2021, O'Reilly was elected as Cathaoirleach (Chairperson) of the Irish Green Party, succeeding Chu, following an election against Councillor Collette Finn and Dr. Bláithín Gallagher.

Personal life
O'Reilly has two children and practises unschooling with them. Her husband Conor works from home.

References

External links
Pauline O'Reilly's page on the Green Party website

Year of birth missing (living people)
Place of birth missing (living people)
Living people
Green Party (Ireland) senators
Local councillors in Galway (city)
Politicians from County Galway
Members of the 26th Seanad
21st-century women members of Seanad Éireann